Delta Phi Lambda (also known as DFL or DPhiL) is a nonprofit Asian-interest sorority in the United States. It was founded at the University of Georgia in 1998. The organization is a co-founder and member of the National Asian Pacific Islander Desi American Panhellenic Association (NAPA). Its campus chapters are members of their local Multicultural Greek Councils (MGCs).

History
Delta Phi Lambda was founded on December 5, 1998 at the University of Georgia in Athens, Georgia, by seven students:
 Anh Ngoc Nguyen
 Theresa Sung
 Sarah Chong Mi Cho
 Carmela de Guzman
 Yvonne Minh Ta
 Linh Khanh Do
 Rebecca Kim Stephenson 

The organization was established to advocate for awareness of Asian students, promote camaraderie among Asians, and educate other students about Asian culture. In addition to increasing Asian awareness, the organization’s mission statement says that Delta Phi Lambda “empowers women leaders through its value-based programs, and forges everlasting sisterhood through shared experiences.” The organization’s virtues are loyalty, honesty, respect, dedication, integrity, discipline, and academic excellence.

In 2010, the Delta Phi Lambda Foundation was founded. The foundation is a non-profit organization affiliated with the Delta Phi Lambda sorority. It provides scholarships and funding for Delta Phi Lambda members. In the same year, the Delta Phi Lambda charter at the University of West Florida became the first MGC-affiliated organization on campus.

In 2020, The University of Tennessee's Delta Phi Lambda chapter became the university's first Asian-interest sorority and the first national Asian interest group on any campus in the state of Tennessee.

Community activities
One of Delta Phi Lambda's focus areas is osteoporosis awareness and prevention. The organization is partnered with American Bone Health. Delta Phi Lambda has also held seminars to increase awareness of sex trafficking.

In 2008, Delta Phi Lambda sponsored a lecture by television journalist Lisa Ling at the University of Cincinnati.

Delta Phi Lambda also was one of the organizations that volunteered for the 2017 Chicago Marathon.

Chapters
These are the chapters of Delta Phi Lambda.  Active groups noted in bold, inactive groups noted in italics.

References

External links

Fraternities and sororities in the United States
Student organizations established in 1998
Sororities
Student societies in the United States